This is an incomplete list of Catholic priests.

Priests

Roman Catholic Church 
Cristóbal Diatristán de Acuña – Jesuit explorer
Alger of Liège – History
Abraham Armand – Missionary to Hawaii
Alexis Bachelot – Missionary to Hawaii
Antonio Vivaldi – Italian baroque composer
Erasmus of Rotterdam – Dutch priest and philosopher
Nicolas Aubry – French priest
Tissa Balasuriya – Sri Lankan Sinhala theologian 
Mary Bastian – Murdered activist in Sri Lanka 
David Bauer – Hockey player turned priest
Josef Bisig – Formerly of the Society of St. Pius X, currently of the recognized Priestly Fraternity of St. Peter
Martin Adolf Bormann – Son of Nazi Martin Bormann who works against Holocaust denial
Jim Borst – Dutch Missionary in India since 1960
Martin Stanislaus Brennan – Astronomer and author
Vincent Robert Capodanno – U.S. Navy chaplain and Medal of Honor recipient.
Francisco Fernández Carvajal – Author and Opus Dei priest.
Solanus Casey – Declared venerable by Pope John Paul II.
William Joseph Chaminade – Faced persecution for being a priest during the French Revolution
Daniele Comboni – Missionary to Africa, canonized
John M. Corridan – Anti-corruption activist
Horacio de la Costa – Filipino Jesuit and writer
Les Costello – A founder of the Flying Fathers exhibition hockey team
Peter Coudrin – Faced persecution during French Revolution, later became a missionary to Hawaii
James Coyle – Murdered Catholic priest
Johannes Czerski – German clergyman who resigned his vicariate to found German Catholicism
 Jozef De Veuster – Canonized, worked with lepers
Chandra Fernando – Murdered human rights activist
Piero Folli – Italian antifascist parish priest
Joseph Freinademetz – Missionary to China, canonized
Mariano Gagnon – Franciscan friar and author who helped indigenous people resist the Shining Path in Peru
Georg Gänswein – Secretary to Pope Benedict XVI
Augustine Geve – Solomon Islands Catholic priest and politician, murdered in 2002
Lionel Groulx – French Canadian Nationalist
Jacques Hamel – Priest killed in the 2016 Normandy church attack.
Elmer Heindl – American WWII chaplain
Ignatius of Loyola – Founder of the Society of Jesus
Itō Mancio – First official Japanese emissary to Europe, after that he became a Jesuit priest
Saint Arnold Janssen – Missionary
Marcelline Jayakody, Sri Lankan Sinhala author, composer of hymns, author, journalist
Mychal F. Judge – Chaplain, 9-11 victim
Georg Joseph Kamel – Jesuit botanist of whom the Camellia is named after. Compiled works on Philippine medicinal plants, which is well known in pharmacology
Francis Kilcoyne (died 1985) – President of Brooklyn College
Georges Lemaître – Physicist and Astronomer. Proposed what would become known as the Big Bang Theory.
Georges-Henri Lévesque – Sociologist
Gerard Timoner III – The current master of the Dominican Order
Eustáquio van Lieshout – Did work in Brazil
Michael J. McGivney – Founder of the Knights of Columbus
Heinrich Maier – Head of an important resistance group against Nazi Germany
Columba Murphy – Involved in gaining an Edict of Toleration for Hawaiian Catholics
Hugh O'Flaherty – World War II hero
Nemesi Marqués Oste – Rector in Andorra and political figure there
Peter Pernin – Survivor and memoirist of the Peshtigo fire
Wolfgang Rösch – Vicar general of Limburg
Jean-Baptiste de La Salle – A founder of the Institute of the Brothers of the Christian Schools
Abraham a Sancta Clara – Catholic preacher in Austria
Francis Xavier – Jesuit missionary to Japan
Vinkenti Peev – Bulgarian Capuchin friar
Thomas Byles – English priest who stayed on board the sinking RMS Titanic hearing confessions
Michael Nazir-Ali – Former prominent Anglican bishop who became Catholic and was ordained a priest on the 30th of October, 2021
Eugine Mattioli - Longest serving Catholic missionary in Arabia
Mihalj Šilobod Bolšić - Roman Catholic priest, mathematician, writer, and musical theorist primarily known for writing the first Croatian arithmetic textbook Arithmatika Horvatzka (published in Zagreb, 1758)

Eastern Catholic Churches
Ghevont Alishan – Priest of the Armenian Catholic Church who designed Armenia's first modern flag.
Walter Ciszek – Byzantine Rite member of the Society of Jesus who was imprisoned at Lubyanka (KGB).
Eddie Doherty – Ordained a priest in the Melkite Greek Catholic Church.
Ed Evanko – Actor who became a Ukrainian Catholic priest.
Nimattullah Kassab Al-Hardini – Catholic saint.
Louis Massignon – Scholar of Islam who transferred to the Melkite Greek Catholic Church after converting to Catholicism and later became a priest.
Alphonse Mingana – Chaldean Catholic Church priest and Orientalist.
Youakim Moubarac – Maronite Church – priest and scholar.
Joseph Raya – a Melkite Greek Catholic priest (later archbishop) active in the U.S. civil rights movement and advocate of Israeli Christian Arabs.

Catholic exorcists
Father Ernst Alt
Father Candido Amantini
Gabriele Amorth – Founder of the International Association of Exorcists
Father Raymond J. Bishop
William S. Bowdern – Participated in an exorcism of Roland Doe in 1949. The incident became the basis of William Peter Blatty's novel The Exorcist.
Jeremy Davies
Father Angelo Fantoni
Father Jose Antonio Fortea
Giancarlo Gramolazzo – Was president of the International Association of Exorcists, until his death in 2010.
Father Alfred Kunz
Father Matteo La Grua
James J. LeBar – New York exorcist consulted with regards to films
Malachi Martin – Writer on unusual subjects as well as an exorcist
Father Theophilus Riesinger 
Father Rosario Stroscio

See also
Lists of Roman Catholics

References

External links
Catholic priests weblink
Catholic hierarchy.org
Search Catholic Priests Online